In the Open is a 1914 American silent short film directed by Sydney Ayres, starring  William Garwood and Louise Lester.

Cast 
 William Garwood as Ben Carroll, a young ranchman
 Louise Lester as his mother
 Harry von Meter as Mendez, a rascally Mexican
 Vivian Rich as Conchita, his stepdaughter
 Reaves Eason as a doctor
 Joe Knight as Deputy Sheriff

External links 
 

1914 films
1914 drama films
1914 short films
Silent American drama films
American silent short films
American black-and-white films
Films directed by Sydney Ayres
1910s American films